Stranger on the Shore is a British television drama serial first broadcast by the BBC in 1961. It was written by Sheila Hodgson, and produced and directed by Kevin Sheldon. The show is described by some as a "children's serial", being shown on Sunday afternoons. The five-episode series portrays Marie-Hélène Ronsin, a young French teenager, on her first trip to England as an au pair.  Speaking some English, but very shy, she lives with a family in Brighton, and faces the challenges of culture shock. The series was followed the following year by a sequel, entitled Stranger in the City.

Acker Bilk's "Jenny" was renamed "Stranger on the Shore" when it was chosen as the theme for the series. It was subsequently released as a single, spending 55 weeks in the UK singles chart and becoming the best-selling record of 1962 in the U.S. chart.

Of the five episodes produced, only two survived the BBC's junkings. The sequel series, Stranger in the City, was also subject to having all six of its episodes wiped, and is completely lost.

Cast
 Jeanne Le Bars as Marie-Hélène Ronsin
 Amanda Grinling as Penelope Gough
 Beatrix Mackey as Mrs. Gough
 Richard Vernon as David Gough
 Denis Gilmore as Paul (Podger) Gough

References

External links
 
 

BBC television dramas
1960s British television miniseries
1961 British television series debuts
1961 British television series endings
1960s British drama television series
English-language television shows